Football was contested at the 2017 Summer Universiade from August 18 to 29 in Taipei, Taiwan.

Medal summary

Medal table

Medal events

Men

Sixteen teams will participate in the men's tournament.

Teams

Pool A

Pool B

Pool C

Pool D

Women

Thirteen teams will participate in the women's tournament.

Teams

Pool A

Pool B

Pool C

Pool D

References

External links
2017 Summer Universiade – Football
Result book – Football

 
2017
Football
2017
2017 in association football